The 1876 South Wiltshire by-election was fought on 4 January 1876.  The byelection was fought due to the incumbent Conservative MP, Lord Henry Thynne, becoming Treasurer of the Household.  It was retained by the incumbent.

References

1876 elections in the United Kingdom
1876 in England
19th century in Wiltshire
January 1876 events
By-elections to the Parliament of the United Kingdom in Wiltshire constituencies
Unopposed ministerial by-elections to the Parliament of the United Kingdom in English constituencies